Rex (also known as Hollingsworth) is an unincorporated community in Clayton County, Georgia, United States. Its elevation is 797 feet (243 m). Although Rex is unincorporated, it has a post office, with the ZIP code of 30273; the ZCTA for ZIP Code 30273 had a population of 11,412 at the 2000 census.

History
A post office called Rex was established in 1882. Rex is a name derived from Latin meaning "king".

The Georgia General Assembly incorporated Rex as a town in 1912. The town's municipal charter was repealed in 1922.

The Historic Rex Village was identified as a place in peril by the 2011 Georgia Historic Trust.

References

External links
Historic Rex Village (Facebook Page)

Former municipalities in Georgia (U.S. state)
Unincorporated communities in Clayton County, Georgia
Unincorporated communities in Georgia (U.S. state)